The University of Quindío, is a public institution and department in Colombia, under the Ministry of Education; Its headquarters are located in Armenia, Quindío, Colombia.

The University of Quindío is a public establishment academic of Department Order, that is, a body with legal autonomy, academic autonomy, administrative and financial independent, assigned to the governorship of Quindío, by Ordinance No. 014, November 1982 and 037 of May 3, 1984, recognized as a university by Act 56 of 1967 and Decree 1583 of January 18, 1975 of the Ministry of Education.

It has 32 undergraduate academic programs and 16 postgraduate. It has 31 research groups, 14 of them categorized and recognized by Colciencias: 2 Category A, 4 Category B and 8 in class C.

History
University of Quindío was founded in 1960 and became an institution of departmental status in 1982. Begins operations in 1962 with the programs of Agronomy and Topography (Surveying). Currently the University has 7 faculties in the areas of: Humanities Sciences, Health Sciences, Engineering, Economics and Administrative Sciences, Education, Basic Sciences and Technology, Science in Agribusiness and distance learning modalities.

The University has 12,000 students including postgraduate students. Its faculty is formed by 854 teachers, 24 of whom are doctoral, 233 masters and 239 specializations.

Academic Offer
The University of Quindío has 7 faculties (schools) which offer the following courses at the undergraduate, postgraduate and diplomaed.

Undergraduate
Faculty of Engineering

 Civil engineering
 Electronic Engineering
 Systems Engineering
 Geomatics/Surveying Technology

Faculty of Agribusiness

 Professionalism in Agricultural Business Management
 Food Engineering
 Agricultural Technology
 Agroindustrial technology
 Chemical Technology of Plant Products

Faculty of Basic Sciences and Technology

 Chemistry
 Biology
 Physics
 Mathematics
 Electronics Technology

Faculty of Humanities sciences

 Philosophy
 Gerontology
 Social Communication and Journalism
 Social work
 Science of Information and Documentation

Faculty of Economics and Administrative Sciences

 Public Accounting
 Financial (distance)
 Business Administration
 Economics

Faculty of Health Sciences

 Medicine
 Nursing
 Occupational health

Faculty of Education Sciences

 Modern Languages with emphasis on English and French degree
 Natural Sciences and Environmental Education degree
 Literature and Castilian Language degree
 Physical Education and Sports degree
 Mathematics degree

Postgraduate
Specialization

 Specializing in investment portfolios and company valuations
 Specialization in Logistics Engineering
 Specialization in International Business and Finance
 Specialization in Tax Management
 Specialization in Tax Auditing and External Auditing
 Specialization in Occupational Health and Occupational Health
 Specialization in Environmental Education
 Specializing in Radio

Master

 Master of Biomedical Sciences
 Master of Materials Science
 Master of Science in Education
 Master of Biomathematics
 Master in Biology
 Master in Chemistry

Doctorate

 PhD in Education
 Biomedical Sciences

Diplomaed

 Diplomaed in Web Site Development
 Diplomaed in Family Intervention
 Diplomaed in Social Research
 Diplomaed in Philosophy and Education
 Diplomaed in New Internal Control Standard Model for State Entities MECI 1000: 2005
 Diplomaed in International Standards of Accounting and Auditing
 Diplomaed in Molecular Biology and Biotechnology
 Diplomaed in Teaching
 Diplomaed in English
 Diplomaed in Neuropsicopedagogía
 Diplomaed in Virtual Environments for Teaching and Learning
 Diplomaed in Treatment and Wastewater Recycling.

See also

 List of universities in Colombia

External links
 University of Quindio official site 
 :es:Universidad del Quindio
 http://www.mineducacion.gov.co/1621/article-93332.html
 http://www.almamater.edu.co/sitio/contenido-universidad-del-quindio-46.html

Universities and colleges in Colombia
Educational institutions established in 1960
Armenia, Colombia
1960 establishments in Colombia